Cardiomegaly (sometimes megacardia or megalocardia) is a medical condition in which the heart becomes enlarged. It is more commonly referred to simply as "having an enlarged heart". It is usually the result of underlying conditions that make the heart work harder, such as obesity, heart valve disease, high blood pressure (hypertension), and coronary artery disease. Cardiomyopathy is also associated with cardiomegaly.

Cardiomegaly can be serious and can result in congestive heart failure. Recent studies suggest that cardiomegaly is associated with a higher risk of sudden cardiac death.

Cardiomegaly may diminish over time, but many people with an enlarged heart (dilated cardiomyopathy) need lifelong medication. Having family history with cardiomegaly may indicate increased risk for this condition.

Lifestyle factors that can help prevent cardiomegaly include eating a healthy diet, controlling blood pressure, exercise, medications, and not abusing alcohol and cocaine.

Signs and symptoms

For many people, cardiomegaly is asymptomatic. For others, if the enlarged heart begins to affect the body's ability to pump blood, then symptoms associated with congestive heart failure may arise, including:
 Heart palpitations – the irregular beating of the heart, usually associated with a valve
 Severe shortness of breath (especially when physically active) 
 Chest pain
 Coughing, when lying down
 Fatigue
 Leg swelling
 Increased abdominal girth
 Weight gain
 Edema – swelling
 Fainting

Causes
The causes of cardiomegaly are not well understood and many cases have no known cause. Lifestyle-related risk factors include tobacco use and high cholesterol, high blood pressure, and diabetes. Non-lifestyle risk factors include a family history of cardiomegaly, coronary artery disease (CAD), congenital heart failure, atherosclerotic disease, valvular heart disease, exposure to cardiac toxins, sleep-disordered breathing (such as sleep apnea), sustained cardiac arrhythmias, abnormal electrocardiograms, and cardiomegaly on chest X-ray. 

Research and the evidence of previous cases link the following (below) as possible causes of cardiomegaly.

The most common causes of cardiomegaly are congenital (patients are born with the condition based on a genetic inheritance), high blood pressure (which can enlarge the left ventricle causing the heart muscle to weaken over time), and coronary artery disease. In the latter case, the disease creates blockages in the heart's blood supply, leading to tissue death which causes other areas of the heart to work harder, causing the heart to expand in size.

Other possible causes include:
 Heart valve disease
 Cardiomyopathy (disease of the heart muscle)
 Pulmonary hypertension
 Pericardial effusion (fluid around the heart)
 Thyroid Disorders
 Hemochromatosis (excessive iron in the blood)
 Amyloidosis
 Chagas disease, an important cause of cardiomegaly in Latin America
 Viral infection of the heart
 Pregnancy, with enlarged heart developing around the time of delivery (peripartum cardiomyopathy)
 Kidney disease requiring dialysis
 Alcohol or cocaine abuse
 HIV infection
 Diabetes

Mechanism
Cardiomegaly is a condition affecting the heart. This condition is strongly associated with congestive heart failure. Within the heart, the working fibers of the myocardial tissue increase in size. As the heart works harder the actin and myosin filaments experience less overlap which increases the size of the myocardial fibers. If there is less overlap of the protein filaments within the sarcomeres of the muscle fibers, they will not be able to effectively pull on one another. If the heart tissue gets too big and stretches too far, then those filaments cannot effectively pull on one another to shorten the muscle fibers, impacting the heart's sliding filament mechanism. If fibers cannot shorten properly and the heart cannot contract properly, then blood cannot be effectively pumped to the lungs to be re-oxygenated or to the body to deliver oxygen to the working tissues of the body.

An enlarged heart is more susceptible to forming blood clots in the heart lining. These clots can form elsewhere in the body, potentially disrupting blood supply to other organs.

Diagnosis
Many techniques and tests are used to diagnose an enlarged heart. These tests can be used to see how efficiently the heart is pumping, determine which chambers of the heart are enlarged, look for evidence of prior heart attacks and determine if a person has congenital heart disease.

 Chest X-Ray: X-ray images help to visualize the condition of the lungs and heart. If the heart is enlarged on an X-ray, other tests will usually be needed to find the cause. A useful measurement on X-ray is the cardio-thoracic ratio, which is the transverse diameter of the heart, compared with that of the thoracic cage. These diameters are taken from PA chest x-rays using the widest point of the chest and measuring as far as the lung pleura, rather than lateral skin margins. If the ratio is greater than 50%, pathology is suspected. The measurement was first proposed in 1919 to screen military recruits. A newer approach to using these x-rays for evaluating heart health takes the ratio of heart area to chest area and has been called the two-dimensional cardiothoracic ratio.
 Electrocardiogram: This test records the electrical activity of the heart through electrodes attached to the skin. Impulses are recorded as waves and displayed on a monitor or printed on paper. This test helps diagnose heart rhythm problems and assess the damage to a person's heart from a heart attack.
 Echocardiogram: This test uses sound waves to produce a video image of the heart. With this test, the four chambers of the heart can be evaluated.
 Stress test: A stress test, also called an exercise stress test, provides information about how well the heart works during physical activity. It usually involves walking on a treadmill or riding a stationary bike while heart rhythm, blood pressure, and breathing are monitored.
 Cardiac computerized tomography (CT) or magnetic resonance imaging (MRI). These techniques create images of the heart for inspection.
 Blood tests: Blood tests may be ordered to check the levels of substances in the blood that may show a heart problem. Blood tests can also help rule out other conditions.

 Cardiac catheterization and biopsy: In this procedure, a thin tube (catheter) is inserted into the groin and threaded through the blood vessels to the heart, where a small sample (biopsy) of the heart, if indicated, can be extracted for laboratory analysis.
 Autopsy: For deceased people, the heart can be weighed. Cardoimegaly is indicated if the heart weighs more than >399 grams in women and >449 grams in men.

Classification 
Cardiomegaly can be classified by the main enlarged location of the heart, and/or by the structure of the enlargement.

Specific subtypes include athletic heart syndrome, which is a non-pathological condition commonly seen in sports medicine in which the heart is enlarged, and the resting heart rate is lower than normal.

By enlarged location 
 Ventricular hypertrophy
 Left
 Right / Cor pulmonale
 Atrial enlargement
 Left
 Right

Structure of enlargement 
Dilated cardiomyopathy is the most common type of cardiomegaly. In this condition, the walls of the left and/or right ventricles of the heart become thin and stretched..

In the other types, the heart's left ventricle becomes abnormally thick. Hypertrophy is usually what causes left ventricular enlargement. Hypertrophic cardiomyopathy is typically an inherited condition.

Treatment
Treatments include a combination of medications and medical/surgical procedures. Below are some of the treatment options:

Medications 
 Diuretics: to lower the amount of sodium and water in the body, which can help lower the pressure in the arteries and heart.
 Angiotensin-converting enzyme (ACE) inhibitors: to lower blood pressure and improve pumping ability.
 Angiotensin receptor blockers (ARBs): to provide the benefits of ACE inhibitors for patients with ACE inhibitor issues.
 Beta blockers: to lower blood pressure and improve heart function.
 Digoxin: to help improve heart pumping function and lessen the need for hospitalization for heart failure.
 Anticoagulants: to reduce blood clot risk.
 Anti-arrhythmics: to maintain normal heart rhythm.

Devices to regulate heartbeat 
 Pacemaker: Coordinates contractions between ventricles. In people at risk of arrhythmias, drug therapy or an implantable cardioverter-defibrillator (ICD).
 ICDs: Small devices implanted in the chest to monitor heart rhythm and deliver electrical shocks to control abnormal heartbeats. The devices can also work as pacemakers.

Surgical procedures 
 Valve surgery: If an enlarged heart is caused by a problem with a heart valve, surgery can remove the valve and replace it with either an artificial valve or a tissue valve from a pig, cow or deceased human donor. If blood leaks backward through a valve (valve regurgitation), the leaky valve may be surgically repaired or replaced.
 Coronary bypass surgery: to address coronary artery disease, which can lead to an enlarged heart.
 Left ventricular assist device: (LVAD): to help a weak heart pump, potentially while waiting for a heart transplant or as a long-term treatment for heart failure.
 Heart transplant: to provide a final option after other treatments fail.

Consequences 
The exact mortality rate for people with cardiomegaly is unknown. However, many people live for a long time with an enlarged heart and, if detected early, treatment can help improve the condition and prolong their lives.
 Heart failure: One of the most serious types of enlarged heart, an enlarged left ventricle, increases the risk of heart failure. In heart failure, the heart muscle weakens, and the ventricles stretch (dilate) to the point that the heart can't pump blood efficiently throughout the body.
 Blood clots: If clots enter the bloodstream, they can block blood flow to vital organs, possibly causing a heart attack or stroke. Clots that develop on the right side of the heart may travel to the lungs, a dangerous condition called a pulmonary embolism.
 Heart murmur: Two of the heart's four valves — the mitral and tricuspid valves — may become dilated and not close properly, leading to a backflow of blood. This flow creates sounds called heart murmurs.
 Cardiomegaly may be a temporary condition that can resolve on its own.

Recommended lifestyle changes 
 Smoking cessation
 Limiting alcohol and caffeine intake
 Maintaining a healthy weight
 Increasing fruits and vegetables in a daily diet
 Limiting consumption of high-fat and/or high-sugar foods
 Getting adequate restful sleep

References

Further reading

External links 

 American Heart Association